The Venerable Samu Sunim (3 March 1941 – 6 August 2022), born Sam-Woo Kim, was a Korean Seon sunim previously of the Jogye Order. He claimed to have received Dharma transmission from Zen Master Weolha Sunim in 1983. He taught primarily in Canada and the United States, having opened centers in Toronto, New York City, Ann Arbor, Michigan and Chicago, Illinois as well as Mexico City.

Biography
Venerable Samu Sunim was born in Chinju, South Korea, on 3 March 1941. Orphaned during the Korean War, he entered a Buddhist monastery following a period of homelessness. In 1958 Sunim began his three-year novitiate at Namjang-sa Monastery in Sangju. He was ordained as a disciple of Tongsan Sunim (1890–1965) and he completed his Zen training under Master Solbong Sunim at  Beomeosa (범어사) in Busan, Korea in 1956 (age 15).
 
“After I left Solbong Sunim and the country I became constantly subject to the ups and downs of life. Like a piece of driftwood I drifted along unprotected in the wide world of conflicts. Sometimes different social forces and currents that tossed me around were so strong and swift that I submerged and suffered loss. Other times I observed and enjoyed different scenery and the changing faces of life situations. All along I was making a journey which had no set purpose aside from my being one with it wherever it took me. Ten years passed from the time I left Solbong Sunim. During those ten years my journey took me to Japan, San Francisco, New York City, Montreal and Toronto.”

When he was conscripted into active military service even though he was a monk, he left his native country for Japan and finally the West. In August 1967 Sunim arrived in New York City. He supported himself by working the night shift at UPS. During the daytime he would make posters and put them up in Washington Square Park and in Greenwich Village. In the evenings, before he went to work the night shift, he sat in meditation with whoever showed up for the meditation practice. This is the beginning of the Zen Lotus Society.

In February 1968 Sunim moved to Montreal, Canada where he founded the Zen Lotus Society (now the Buddhist Society for Compassionate Wisdom) while living in a second floor apartment at 3628 Park Avenue. While originally a monk within the Jogye Order, Samu Sunim's Buddhist Society for Compassionate Wisdom does not require celibacy. 
It was here that he was married to Marianne Bluger (whom he met at McGill University through the Religious Studies Department) and where his two children were born. This apartment was also where the Society functioned by holding regular meditation classes and conducting weekend retreats. The Society became the first Zen centre in Montreal.

After moving with his wife Marianne and two small children to Toronto, Canada in 1971 Samu renounced his family, choosing to identify as a Buddhist teacher and focus on that. He left to complete a three year solitary retreat before beginning his teaching career. Sunim dedicated himself whole-heartedly to Buddhist teachings for over 60 years.  His wife and children moved to Ottawa where Marianne raised their children as a single mother.  Samu reactivated the Zen Lotus Society from a basement apartment on Markham Street in Toronto serving the Korean-Canadian community and gave meditation instruction during the week. In 1979 Ven. Samu Sunim and a small group of his students moved the Zen Lotus Society into a former synagogue on Vaughan Road, in Toronto.

The building was extensively renovated through the effort and manpower of those first disciples. Over the years Ven. Samu Sunim and the Zen Lotus Society has provided Buddhist meditation training, held Buddhist art and photography exhibitions, hosted visiting Buddhist teachers and organized public events such as Buddha's Birthday celebrations, benefits for the poor and hungry and peace vigils. In 1985 he established a three year Dharma Student Training Program (now the Maitreya Buddhist Seminary) to provide a consistent study-practice program for serious students wishing to train as priests or teachers. 

Ven. Samu Sunim also founded the Zen Buddhist Temple in Ann Arbor in 1981, the Zen Buddhist Temple in Chicago founded in 1992, and the Zen Buddhist Temple in New York City in 2011. In the tradition of community effort all temples have been renovated and remodeled with the help of many volunteer man-hours always under the strong leadership and spiritual guidance of Ven. Samu Sunim. In 1988 the Zen Lotus Society in Toronto moved to larger premises in the former Ukrainian Credit Union and Community Centre on College Street, where in 1989 Ven. Samu Sunim organized "A Day of Celebration in Honor of the Dalai Lama receiving the Nobel Prize for Peace." In 1990 delegates came from across Canada to attend the seven day "Conference on Buddhism in Canada" which he organized and co-hosted. Ven. Samu Sunim's concern for inter-Buddhist dialogue led to his organizing the conference "Zen Buddhism in North America" held at his temple in Ann Arbor Michigan in 1986 for the new generation of North American trained Zen teachers. In 1987 also in Ann Arbor he organized the "Conference on World Buddhism in North America," a historic gathering of ethnic and Western Buddhist leaders of most traditions active in North America. In addition, Ven. Samu Sunim has published two Buddhist publications, Spring Wind-Buddhist Cultural Forum, an international Buddhist quarterly journal from 1983-1986, and Buddhism at the Crossroads, a Buddhist magazine initiated in 1990.

“In the late fall of 1977 I finished my three-year retreat. On the day when I finished my retreat I held a service in which I invited the spirit of Solbong Sunim and asked his Dharma be transmitted. I became his Dharma heir after the service. I offered the following gatha for the occasion:
Having grown trees without root;Having built gates with no pillarsYou have allowed all beings to come in and outAnd to enjoy joy and sorrow!Larger than heaven and smaller than a grain of sandThe meritorious acts of the Buddhas and Patriarchs are,            I now realize.Ah-ah, Oh-oh, uh-uh, Ih-ih, Eh-eh, Bodhi Svaha.”

Samu Sunim claimed to have received a more traditional authorization as a Zen master from Weolha Sunim in 1983 . He is often cited in works by his former student Geri Larkin.

Prior to his death in the Toronto Temple, Samu Sunim resided in the most recently founded temple in New York City and served as Zen Master of the Society's five temples in Toronto, Ann Arbor, Chicago, Mexico City and New York City. Samu Sunim died from Parkinson's disease in Toronto on 6 August 2022, at the age of 81.

Buddhist Society for Compassionate Wisdom / Zen Lotus Society
The Zen Lotus society was founded as a non-profit religious organization and North American Buddhist Order. Since 1990 it has been known as the Buddhist Society for Compassionate Wisdom (BSCW) and is originally from the Korean Zen (Seon) tradition. The change of name reflected an important development in the movement of the Society. The experience of more than twenty years of Seon-Zen Lotus Society paved the way for making the necessary transition from Asian forms of monastic Buddhism to salvation and enlightenment for all. On the surface this transition was the modern-day renewal and reapplication of the five major pronouncement of Mahayana teachings:

  All sentient beings are buddhas. 
  Samsara is Nirvana. 
  One's passions are enlightenment. 
  We are an interrelated whole. 
  Everyday life is the Way.

The Society was established with a view to spreading Buddhadharma in America through teaching the practice of Zen and promoting Buddhist culture.
Initially Samu Sunim supported himself and the society by working the night shift at United Parcel Service. During the daytime he would make posters and put them up in Washington Square Park and Greenwich Village. In the evenings, before work, he would sit in meditation with whoever showed up.

In February 1968 the Society moved with Samu Sunim to Montreal, Canada. The Zen Lotus Society became established in a second floor apartment at 3628 Park Avenue in Montreal, where Samu Sunim finally settled with his wife Marianne and where his son Maji (b. 1969), and his daughter Micheline (Agi b. 1970) were born. It was also there that the Society functioned by holding regular meditation classes and conducting weekend retreats. The Society became the first Zen centre in Montreal. In the summer of '69 the Society acquired a piece of land near Brockville, Ontario, in an attempt to develop a rural spiritual community and to provide a site for holding countryside retreats. Soon after, However, Samu Sunim had to move again. The entire Park Avenue block where he lived was to be demolished for redevelopment. In the fall of 1970 he moved alone to Knowlton in the Eastern Township of Quebec to spend the winter in the county. At that time the Society ceased to function.

In the spring of 1972 Samu Sunim moved to Toronto and settled in the basement of 378 Markham Street with Marianne and their two small children, but soon he separated from Marianne. The Zen Lotus Society was reactivated in 1977 following Sunim's 3-year retreat. After a few attempts to establish a practicing community in a rented house, the Society purchased and old, run down flophouse in Parkdale in 1979. The Parkdale residence required extensive renovations and consumed all the energy of the Society for the following 3 years. In 1981 the Society opened a branch in Ann Arbor Michigan, which eventually developed into the Zen Buddhist Temple - Ann Arbor (which then served as the American office of the Zen Lotus Society).

See also
zen buddhist temple
Buddhism in Canada
Buddhism in the United States
Timeline of Zen Buddhism in the United States
Venerable Samu Sunim's Online Memorial

Notes

References

 http://monkeymindonline.blogspot.com/2008/09/zen-master-samu-sunim.html

1941 births
2022 deaths
Chogye Buddhists
Seon Buddhist monks